Charne Bosman of South Africa won the women's 2016 Comrades Marathon.

References

South African ultramarathon runners
1975 births
Living people
Female ultramarathon runners